Eight ships of the Royal Navy have been named HMS Ajax after the Greek hero Ajax:
  was a 74-gun third-rate ship of the line launched in 1767 and sold in 1785.
  was a 74-gun third rate launched in 1798. She fought at the Battle of Trafalgar in 1805 and was burned by accident in 1807.
  was a 74-gun third rate launched in 1809. She was converted to screw propulsion in 1846 and broken up in 1864.
She was renamed HMS Ajax in 1867 and was broken up in 1875.
  was an  battleship launched in 1880 and sold in 1904.
  was a  battleship launched in 1912 and broken up in 1926.
  was a  light cruiser launched in 1934. She took part in the Battle of the River Plate and was broken up in 1949.
  was a  launched in 1962 and broken up in 1988.
  was an Admiralty barge built in 1956.

Battle Honours

 St. Vincent 1780
 St Kitts 1782
 The Saints 1782
 Egypt 1801
 Trafalgar 1805
 San Sebastian 1813
 Baltic 1854–55
 Jutland 1916
 River Plate 1939
 Mediterranean 1940–41
 Matapan 1941
 Greece 1941
 Crete 1941
 Malta Convoys 1941
 Aegean 1944
 Normandy 1944
 South France 1944

See also

References

 

Royal Navy ship names